Norms of Liberty: A Perfectionist Basis for Non-Perfectionist Politics is a 2005 work of political philosophy by the philosophers Douglas B. Rasmussen and Douglas Den Uyl.

Availability
Norms of Liberty: A Perfectionist Basis for Non-Perfectionist Politics is available in paperback under  (University Park, PA: Penn State University Press, 2005).

References

External links 
 David Gordon's review of Norms of Liberty: A Perfectionist Basis for Non-Perfectionist Politics
 Shawn E. Klein's review of Norms of Liberty: A Perfectionist Basis for Non-Perfectionist Politics

2005 non-fiction books
American non-fiction books
Contemporary philosophical literature
English-language books
Philosophy books
Political philosophy literature
Penn State University Press books
Works by Douglas B. Rasmussen
Works by Douglas Den Uyl